Nicholas Stephen Shutt (b 1958) has been Archdeacon of Plymouth since 2019.

Shutt was educated at  Queen Mary College, London and practiced as a solicitor until his call to ordination. He served as a Non Stipendiary Minister, Priest in charge and Rector of Yelverton before his appointment as Archdeacon.

References

1958 births
Living people
21st-century English Anglican priests
20th-century English Anglican priests
Alumni of Queen Mary University of London
English solicitors
Archdeacons of Plymouth